Siphocampylus is a genus of flowering plants in the family Campanulaceae. There are approximately 221 species native to the Neotropical realm. Most grow in mountain habitat.

Species include:
 Siphocampylus affinis (Mirb.) McVaugh
 Siphocampylus asplundii Jeppesen
 Siphocampylus ecuadoriensis E.Wimm.
 Siphocampylus fruticosus E.Wimm.
 Siphocampylus furax E.Wimm.
 Siphocampylus humboldtianus C.Presl ex A.DC.
 Siphocampylus loxensis (Willd. ex Schult.) Vatke ex E.Wimm.
 Siphocampylus lucidus E.Wimm.
 Siphocampylus rostratus E.Wimm.
 Siphocampylus rupestris E.Wimm.
 Siphocampylus scandens (Kunth) G.Don
 Siphocampylus sulfureus E.Wimm.
 Siphocampylus uncipes McVaugh

References

 
Campanulaceae genera
Neotropical realm flora
Taxonomy articles created by Polbot